"Holdin' Onto Something" is a song written by Tom Shapiro and Thom McHugh, and recorded by American country music artist Jeff Carson.  It was released in March 1996 as the fourth single from his debut album Jeff Carson. The song reached number 6 on the Billboard Hot Country Singles & Tracks chart in June 1996. Before its release, it was the b-side to the album's third single, "The Car".

It was also recorded by John Michael Montgomery on his 1995 self-titled album.

Chart performance

References

1996 singles
Jeff Carson songs
John Michael Montgomery songs
Songs written by Tom Shapiro
Curb Records singles
1995 songs
Songs written by Thom McHugh